The 1976 European Figure Skating Championships was a senior-level international competition held in Geneva, Switzerland on January 13–18. Elite senior-level figure skaters from European ISU member nations competed for the title of European Champion in the disciplines of men's singles, ladies' singles, pair skating, and ice dancing.

Results

Men

Ladies

Pairs

Ice dancing

References

External links
 results

European Figure Skating Championships, 1976
Figure
European Figure Skating Championships
International figure skating competitions hosted by Switzerland
Sports competitions in Geneva
20th century in Geneva
January 1976 sports events in Europe